The Kirby 23 is a sailboat that was designed by Canadian Bruce Kirby as a racer-cruiser and first built in 1985.

The Kirby 23 is a development of the Sonar, with a cabin modified for cruising use. It is very similar to the Blazer 23.

Production
The design was built by Ross Marine starting in 1985, with six boats completed, but it is now out of production.

Design
The Kirby 23 is a recreational keelboat, built predominantly of fibreglass. It has a fractional sloop rig, a raked stem, a reverse transom, an internally mounted spade-type rudder controlled by a tiller and a fixed fin keel. It displaces  and carries  of ballast.

See also
List of sailing boat types

Related development
Blazer 23
Sonar (keelboat)

References

External links

Photo of a Kirby 23

Keelboats
1980s sailboat type designs
Sailing yachts
Trailer sailers
Sailboat type designs by Bruce Kirby
Sailboat types built by Ross Marine